3GL may refer to:

 95.5 K-Rock, a Geelong, Victoria radio station, formerly known as 3GL
 Third-generation programming language
 Metal Storm 3GL, a semi-automatic electronic grenade launcher for infantry